Kapayan is a state constituency in Sabah, Malaysia, that is represented in the Sabah State Legislative Assembly.

History

Election results

References 

Sabah state constituencies